DAT in the context of chemotherapy is an acronym that means a chemotherapy regimen most often used as an induction regimen in acute myelogenous leukemia, usually for those who are refractory to the standard "7+3" induction regimen or who has relapsed. But this regimen also can be used as primary, first-line induction therapy.

The DAT regimen consists of:
 (D)aunorubicin - an anthracycline antibiotic that is able to intercalate DNA, thus disrupting cell division and preventing mitosis;
 (A)ra-C (cytarabine) - an antimetabolite;
 (T)hioguanine - another antimetabolite.

Dosing regimen

References

Chemotherapy regimens used in acute myeloid leukemia